The Guggernüll is a mountain of the Swiss Lepontine Alps, overlooking Nufenen in the canton of Graubünden. It lies north of Pizzo Tambo.

References

External links
 Guggernüll on Hikr

Mountains of the Alps
Mountains of Switzerland
Mountains of Graubünden
Lepontine Alps
Two-thousanders of Switzerland